Biscathorpe is an ecclesiastical parish and site of Biscathorpe medieval village. It is a Conservation Area managed by DEFRA, and is traversed by the Viking Way.

Biscathorpe has three buildings adjacent to the site of the medieval village, Biscathorpe House, Church Cottage, converted to luxury holiday accommodation in 2013 and the Grade II* listed Anglican parish church dedicated to St Helen. The church was built in the early 1840s, rebuilt in 1850, and restored in 1913.

Oil and Gas exploration
A Planning Application was submitted by Egdon Resources Plc in August 2013 to drill an oil well to the east of the Biscathorpe fords.  Egdon intends to produce conventional oil from the Upper Carboniferous.

References

External links

    Location map of Biscathorpe
 Aerial view of Biscathorpe

Hamlets in Lincolnshire
East Lindsey District
Deserted medieval villages in Lincolnshire